"Avaimet mun himaan" is a song by Finnish rapper Cheek featuring Idän Ihme & Tupla-S. Released in 2004, the song serves as the third single from Cheek's first studio album Avaimet mun kulmille. "Avaimet mun himaan" peaked at number 16 on the Finnish Singles Chart.

Chart performance

References

2004 singles
2004 songs
Cheek (rapper) songs
Sony Music singles